Bartolome "Bartolo" Portuondo (August 24, 1893 – May 26, 1981) was a Cuban baseball infielder in the Cuban League and the U.S. Negro leagues. In Cuba he played from 1911/12 to 1926/27 with several teams, most notably Almendares. His American career lasted from 1915 to 1927; he played for the Cuban Stars (East), Cuban Stars (West), and the Kansas City Monarchs, among other teams.

Portuondo's wife was a member of a wealthy white Cuban family. Their daughter Omara Portuondo became an internationally known singer.

References

External links
 and Baseball-Reference Black Baseball stats and Seamheads
Negro League Baseball Players Association

1893 births
1981 deaths
Cuban baseball players
Kansas City Monarchs players
San Francisco Park players
Habana players
Almendares (baseball) players
Cuban Stars (West) players
Cuban Stars (East) players